Manuel Minginfel (born September 28, 1978) is a former weightlifter representing the Federated States of Micronesia.

In the 62 kg category, he ranked 10th at the 2004 Summer Olympics, 7th at the 2005 World Weightlifting Championships, and 4th at the 2006 World Weightlifting Championships.

At the 2008 Oceania Championships he won the gold medal in the 62 kg category. He also represented the Federated States of Micronesia in weightlifting at the 2008 Summer Olympics in Beijing, China, where he ranked 11th in the 62 kg category. He was also his country's flag bearer during the Games' opening ceremony.

He competed in the 2012 Summer Olympics where he ranked #10 in the Men's 62 kg category.

Minginfel is a native of Yap. He set a new record snatch in the men's 56 kilo category at the South Pacific Games in Samoa in 2007.

Major results

Child Sex abuse controversy and conviction
It was reported by herald that a child reported in 2018 that an inappropriate touch has occurred twice, then at age younger than 13. Minginfel initially denied the allegations, but he admitted sexually touching the girl once. He was pleaded guilty to indecent liberties in November 2019 for sexual contact with a girl incapable of consent. He was sentenced the week before in January. On his release from prison, Minginfel will be on probation for three years and  will also have to register as a sex offender.

References

External links
 
 United States Office of Insular Affairs: Micronesian Weightlifter Sets New Record at South Pacific Games in Samoa
 United States Office of Insular Affairs: Micronesian Weightlifter Going to Beijing Olympics
 Athlete Biography at beijing2008

1978 births
Living people
People from Yap State
Federated States of Micronesia male weightlifters
Weightlifters at the 2000 Summer Olympics
Weightlifters at the 2004 Summer Olympics
Weightlifters at the 2008 Summer Olympics
Weightlifters at the 2012 Summer Olympics
Olympic weightlifters of the Federated States of Micronesia
Federated States of Micronesia people convicted of child sexual abuse